The Central District of Zehak County is a district (bakhsh) in Zehak County, Sistan and Baluchestan Province, Iran. At the 2006 census, its population was 49,813, in 10,039 families.  The District has one city: Zehak.

References 

Zehak County
Districts of Sistan and Baluchestan Province